Charles Michael Loyd (born May 4, 1956) is a former American football quarterback in the National Football League and American football coach. He was with the St. Louis Cardinals (1979–1980). He would appear in five games during the 1980 NFL season and start one game. Loyd later coached football at both the high school and junior college levels, including Northeastern Oklahoma A&M College in Miami, Oklahoma and Rogers High School in Rogers, Arkansas. At Rogers, Loyd coached local legend Case Hampton for one year. After a nearly 40-year coaching career, Loyd retired in December 2020.

Career statistics

References

American football quarterbacks
Players of American football from Missouri
American players of Canadian football
Canadian football quarterbacks
Coaches of American football
Edmonton Elks players
Oklahoma Outlaws players
Saskatchewan Roughriders players
St. Louis Cardinals (football) players
Living people
1956 births
High school football coaches in Oklahoma
High school football coaches in Florida
Northeastern Oklahoma A&M Golden Norsemen football coaches
High school football coaches in Missouri
High school football coaches in Arkansas